Kalinov can refer to several settlements:
in Slovakia:
Kalinov, a village in Medzilaborce District
a part of the municipality Krásno nad Kysucou
in Ukraine:
Kalyniv  
a settlement in  Lviv Oblast
Kalyniv  
a settlement in Sumska Oblast
in Russia, a settlement situated in the administrative units:
Orlovskaya Oblast
Kurskaya Oblast
Voronezhskaya Oblast
Rostovskaya Oblast
Krasnodar Krai
Volgogradskaya Oblast

Kalinov airfield
in Ukraine:
Kalyniv (airfield)